György Nagy (21 December 1926 – 7 September 2004) was a Hungarian basketball player. He competed in the men's tournament at the 1948 Summer Olympics.

References

External links

1926 births
2004 deaths
Hungarian men's basketball players
Olympic basketball players of Hungary
Basketball players at the 1948 Summer Olympics
Basketball players from Budapest